Sapinière is a French term.

 Sapinière (raft), a type of industrial river raft
 La Sapinière, the French name of the Sodalitium Pianum Vatican organisation